The Shuikou Dam is a concrete gravity dam on the Minjiang River in Fujian Province, China. The primary purpose of the dam is hydroelectric power generation and it supports a 1,400 MW power station with 7 x 200 MW Kaplan turbines. The dam also provides navigation with a 500-ton flight of 3 ship locks and a 500-ton ship lift. Other purposes include flood control, irrigation and recreation.

See also 

 List of power stations in China

References

Hydroelectric power stations in Fujian
Dams in China
Gravity dams
Dams completed in 1996
Locks of China